The Diversion Dam and Deer Flat Embankments is the collective name given in the U.S. National Register of Historic Places program to a set of three dams in the western United States in southwestern Idaho, near Boise and Nampa.

The Boise River Diversion Dam also provides hydroelectric generation capacity. The dams were listed on the National Register in 1976.

The three dams that make up the Diversion Dam and Deer Flat Embankments are:
Boise River Diversion Dam
Deer Flat Upper Embankment
Deer Flat Lower Embankment

See also 
National Register of Historic Places listings in Ada County, Idaho
National Register of Historic Places listings in Canyon County, Idaho
Deer Flat National Wildlife Refuge

References

External links 

Dams on the National Register of Historic Places in Idaho
United States Bureau of Reclamation dams
National Register of Historic Places in Ada County, Idaho
National Register of Historic Places in Canyon County, Idaho
Historic districts on the National Register of Historic Places in Idaho
1906 establishments in Idaho
Dams completed in 1912
Boise Project